Municipal Corporation elections are conducted to elect municipal councillors and ward representatives for municipal corporations in India. With the enactment of the 74th Constitution Amendment Act in the Constitution of India, the city municipal corporations were identified as 'institutions of self-government'. With India being a democratic country, elections are the only medium for people to elect governments of their choice.

History and administration 

Municipal corporation elections are one tier of the three-tier governance system in India. Municipal corporation elections are contested both by men and women. Average turnout in municipal elections during surveys is estimated to be around 52%.

Constitutional compulsions 

The system of elections in urban local bodies (ULB) was strengthened with the 74th Constitutional Amendment. The Amendment Act recognised municipal  orporations as 'institutions of self-government'.

Planning body 

Municipal corporation elections are conducted under the supervision of the State Election Commission. The State Election Commission is an independent body and consists of individual members who have served as bureaucrats at the state and national level with high reputation, integrity and values.

Qualifications for contesting 

Qualification for contesting municipal corporation elections in India:

 Citizen of India.
 Has attained the age of 21 years.
 Registered in ward electoral roll.
 Not disqualified under any law for contesting municipal elections.
 Not employed by any municipal corporation in India.

Important rulings 

 Municipal corporation elections in Tamil Nadu should not be delayed was the Supreme Court ruling to Tamil Nadu State Election Commission.
 Municipal corporation elections in Maharashtra are directed to be conducted under a single-member electoral panel as per the direction of State Election Commission.

See also 
 Municipal Corporations in India

References

External links 
 www.example.com